Tenuiphantes is a genus of sheet weavers that was first described by Michael I. Saaristo & A. V. Tanasevitch in 1996.

Species
 it contains forty-four species, found in Asia, Oceania, Africa, Europe, Argentina, Micronesia, New Zealand, and Chile:
Tenuiphantes aduncus (Zhu, Li & Sha, 1986) – China
Tenuiphantes aequalis (Tanasevitch, 1987) – Turkey, Russia, Armenia
Tenuiphantes alacris (Blackwall, 1853) – Europe
Tenuiphantes altimontanus Tanasevitch & Saaristo, 2006 – Nepal
Tenuiphantes ancatus (Li & Zhu, 1989) – China
Tenuiphantes ateripes (Tanasevitch, 1988) – Russia
Tenuiphantes canariensis (Wunderlich, 1987) – Canary Is.
Tenuiphantes cantabropyrenaeus Bosmans, 2016 – Spain, France
Tenuiphantes contortus (Tanasevitch, 1986) – Russia, Georgia, Azerbaijan, Armenia
Tenuiphantes cracens (Zorsch, 1937) – North America
Tenuiphantes crassus Tanasevitch & Saaristo, 2006 – Nepal
Tenuiphantes cristatus (Menge, 1866) – Europe, Turkey, Caucasus
Tenuiphantes drenskyi (van Helsdingen, 1977) – Bulgaria
Tenuiphantes flavipes (Blackwall, 1854) – Europe
Tenuiphantes floriana (van Helsdingen, 1977) – Romania, Macedonia, Greece
Tenuiphantes fogarasensis (Weiss, 1986) – Romania
Tenuiphantes fulvus (Wunderlich, 1987) – Canary Is.
Tenuiphantes herbicola (Simon, 1884) – Spain, France (incl. Corsica), Italy, Croatia, Albania, Greece, Algeria
Tenuiphantes jacksoni (Schenkel, 1925) – Switzerland, Balkans?, Turkey?
Tenuiphantes jacksonoides (van Helsdingen, 1977) – Switzerland, Germany, Austria
Tenuiphantes lagonaki Tanasevitch, Ponomarev & Chumachenko, 2016 – Russia (Caucasus)
Tenuiphantes leprosoides (Schmidt, 1975) – Canary Is.
Tenuiphantes mengei (Kulczyński, 1887) – Europe, Caucasus, Russia (Europe to Far East), Central Asia
Tenuiphantes miguelensis (Wunderlich, 1992) – Azores, Madeira
Tenuiphantes monachus (Simon, 1884) – Europe
Tenuiphantes morosus (Tanasevitch, 1987) – Russia, Georgia, Azerbaijan
Tenuiphantes nigriventris (L. Koch, 1879) – Northern Europe, Russia, Kazakhstan, China, Japan
Tenuiphantes perseus (van Helsdingen, 1977) – Russia, Central Asia, Iran
Tenuiphantes plumipes (Tanasevitch, 1987) – Nepal
Tenuiphantes retezaticus (Ruzicka, 1985) – Romania
Tenuiphantes sabulosus (Keyserling, 1886) – North America
Tenuiphantes spiniger (Simon, 1929) – France
Tenuiphantes stramencola (Scharff, 1990) – Tanzania
Tenuiphantes striatiscapus (Wunderlich, 1987) – Canary Is.
Tenuiphantes suborientalis Tanasevitch, 2000 – Russia
Tenuiphantes teberdaensis Tanasevitch, 2010 – Russia (Caucasus), Georgia
Tenuiphantes tenebricola (Wider, 1834) – Europe, Turkey, Russia, China
Tenuiphantes tenebricoloides (Schenkel, 1938) – Canary Is., Madeira
Tenuiphantes tenuis (Blackwall, 1852) (type) – Europe, Macaronesia, Northern Africa, Turkey, Caucasus, Central Asia. Introduced to USA, Chile, Argentina, New Zealand
Tenuiphantes wunderlichi (Saaristo & Tanasevitch, 1996) – Turkey
Tenuiphantes zebra (Emerton, 1882) – North America
Tenuiphantes zelatus (Zorsch, 1937) – Canada, USA
Tenuiphantes zibus (Zorsch, 1937) – Canada, USA
Tenuiphantes zimmermanni (Bertkau, 1890) – Europe, Russia

See also
 List of Linyphiidae species (Q–Z)

References

Araneomorphae genera
Linyphiidae
Spiders of Africa
Spiders of Asia
Spiders of North America